Dick Van Dyke (born December 13, 1925) is an American actor, comedian, singer, dancer, writer and producer. He first gained recognition on radio and Broadway, then he became known for his role as Rob Petrie on the CBS television sitcom The Dick Van Dyke Show, which ran from 1961 to 1966. He also gained significant popularity for roles in the musical films Bye Bye Birdie (1963), Mary Poppins (1964), and Chitty Chitty Bang Bang (1968).

On television, he is known for his roles in The New Dick Van Dyke Show (1971–1974), Diagnosis: Murder (1993–2001), and Murder 101 (2006–2008).

Performances

Film

Television

Stage

Albums
 Bye Bye Birdie (original cast album) (1960)
 Bye Bye Birdie (soundtrack) (1963)
 Mary Poppins (soundtrack) (1964)
 Songs I Like by Dick Van Dyke (with Enoch Light & his Orchestra/Ray Charles Singers) (1963)
 Chitty Chitty Bang Bang (soundtrack) (1968)
 Put on a Happy Face (with Dick Van Dyke and The Vantastix) (2008)
 Rhythm Train (with Leslie Bixler and Chad Smith) (2010)
 Step (Back) in Time BixMix Records (2017)
 We're Going Caroling (with Jane Lynch) KitschTone Records (2017)

Notes

References

External links
 
 
 
 Dick Van Dyke at Rotten Tomatoes

Male actor filmographies
American filmographies
Dick Van Dyke